The St. James Apartments are a historic apartment house at 573 State Street & 5 Oak Street in Springfield, Massachusetts.  Built in 1904, it is a good local example of Classical Revival architecture.  It was listed on the National Register of Historic Places in 2020.

Description and history
The St. James Apartments are located just southeast of the extended former Springfield Armory grounds, at the southeast corner of State Street and Oak Street.  It is a four-story masonry structure, organized in a U shape with its main facade facing State Street and wings extending south.  Both street-facing facades feature projecting rounded bays, with one at the street corner.  Ground-floor windows are set in round-arch openings, while the second and third-floor windows have keystones of cast stone.  Bands of cast stone and multicolored and projecting brick courses add interest to the facades, and a cornice separates the first and second floors.  The interior houses eighteen units of varying size, retaining only a modest number of period features.

The block was built in 1904 by Joseph Laliberte to a design by William B. Reid.  Both Reid and Laliberte were Canadian immigrants resident in Holyoke, and the building appears to have been a speculative venture. Its construction is representative of the growth of the area's immigrant Canadian population in the city in the early 20th century.  Its early residents were a mix of tradespeople and skilled craftsmen, including immigrants from Canada and Ireland.  The building's interior underwent a major renovation in 1983.

See also
National Register of Historic Places listings in Springfield, Massachusetts
National Register of Historic Places listings in Hampden County, Massachusetts

References

External links
 St. James Apartments MACRIS Listing

Apartment buildings in Springfield, Massachusetts
Apartment buildings on the National Register of Historic Places in Massachusetts
National Register of Historic Places in Springfield, Massachusetts
Residential buildings completed in 1902
1902 establishments in Massachusetts
Neoclassical architecture in Massachusetts